The Perishable Agricultural Commodities Act, 1930 (PACA), enacted 10 June 1930 and codified as Chapter 20A of Title 7 of the United States Code, is a law that authorizes the regulation of the buying and selling of fresh and frozen fruits and vegetables to prevent unfair trading practices and to assure that sellers will be paid promptly. 

According to PACA, both produce sellers and buyers must pay fees for a license in order to do business, and these license fees are the source of funding for a trust program that resolves disputes and protects sellers from non-payment when buyers become bankrupt. Amendments to the Act in 1995 (Sec. 3) include a 3-year phase out of the annual license fees for retailers and grocery wholesaler-dealers to be replaced by one-time fee. ( et seq.).

References

1930 in American law
71st United States Congress
United States federal agriculture legislation